The 2011–12 Argentine Primera C is the season of professional fourth division of Argentine football league system. With a total of 20 teams competing there, the champion is promoted to the upper level, Primera B Metropolitana.

Club information

Table

Standings

Torneo Reducido

Relegation

Playoff for relegation/promotion playoff 

|}

Relegation/promotion Playoff

|-

|-
|}

See also
2011–12 in Argentine football

References

External links
List of Argentine second division champions by RSSSF
Futbol de Ascenso Primera C 

4
Primera C seasons